Volodymyr Tohuzov (born 31 August 1966 in Potsdam, German Democratic Republic) also known as Vladimir Toguzov is a former Ossetiian wrestler who competed in the 1988 Summer Olympics, in the 1992 Summer Olympics, and in the 1996 Summer Olympics.

References

1966 births
Living people
Soviet male sport wrestlers
Ukrainian male sport wrestlers
Olympic wrestlers of the Soviet Union
Olympic wrestlers of the Unified Team
Olympic wrestlers of Ukraine
Olympic bronze medalists for the Soviet Union
Olympic medalists in wrestling
Medalists at the 1988 Summer Olympics
Wrestlers at the 1988 Summer Olympics
Wrestlers at the 1992 Summer Olympics
Wrestlers at the 1996 Summer Olympics
Sportspeople from Potsdam
World Wrestling Championships medalists